"I Am tha 1" is a song credited to Mr Timothy featuring Inaya Day. The song was released in July 2004 as the lead single from Mr Timothy's debut studio album This Is Tha 1. The song peaked at number 28 on the ARIA Charts.

At the ARIA Music Awards of 2004, the song was nominated for ARIA Award for Best Dance Release.

Track listings

Charts

References

2004 singles
2004 songs
Songs written by Gary Pinto